Iver Schriver (born 9 April 1949) is a former Danish footballer.

Biography
Iver Schriver was born in Lemvig but moved to Aulum with his family at a young age. Already then it was obvious that Schriver was a big talent.

In 1970 Schriver made his first big move from Herning Fremad to the Danish top side Vejle Boldklub. In Vejle Schriver experienced winning the Danish championship in 1971 and The double in 1972. As a result of this Schriver was called up for the Danish national team, where he played five matches and scored six goals.

In 1972 Schriver moved abroad to play for Sturm Graz in Austria before joining Beerschot in 1975. After this Schriver went back to Vejle Boldklub. The same year the club won the Danish Cup.

External links
 Vejle Boldklub profile
 Danish national team profile

1949 births
Living people
Danish men's footballers
Vejle Boldklub players
Association football forwards
People from Lemvig
Sportspeople from the Central Denmark Region